Myles Dorn (born June 25, 1998) is an American football free safety for the Carolina Panthers of the National Football League (NFL). He played college football at North Carolina.

Professional career

Minnesota Vikings
Dorn was signed by the Minnesota Vikings as an undrafted free agent on April 28, 2020. He suffered a broken toe in the Vikings' final preseason practice and was waived with an injury designation. Dorn reverted to the injured reserve after clearing waivers on September 6, 2020. He was released on August 31, 2021, during final roster cuts and re-signed to the practice squad the next day. Dorn was elevated to the active roster on September 18, 2021, for the team's Week 2 game against the Arizona Cardinals and made his NFL debut in the game. He signed a reserve/future contract with the Vikings on January 10, 2022.

Dorn was waived by the Vikings on August 30, 2022. He was re-signed to the practice squad one day later. He was promoted to the active roster on October 8. He was waived on October 17 and re-signed to the practice squad.

Carolina Panthers
On January 18, 2023, Dorn signed a reserve/future contract with the Carolina Panthers.

Personal life
Dorn's father, Torin Dorn, played defensive back at North Carolina and in the NFL for seven seasons.

References

External links
North Carolina Tar Heels bio
Minnesota Vikings bio

Living people
1998 births
African-American players of American football
American football defensive backs
Players of American football from North Carolina
Minnesota Vikings players
North Carolina Tar Heels football players
Carolina Panthers players